Peninsular Malaysia (Jawi: سمننجڠ مليسيا), historically known as Malaya (Jawi: تانه ملايو), also known as West Malaysia or the Malaysian Peninsula, is the part of Malaysia that occupies the southern half of the Malay Peninsula in Southeast Asia and the nearby islands. Its area totals , which is nearly 40% of the total area of the country; the other 60% is in East Malaysia. It shares a land border with Thailand to the north  and a maritime border with Singapore to the south.

Across the Strait of Malacca to the west lies the island of Sumatra, and across the South China Sea to the east lie the Natuna Islands of Indonesia. At its southern tip, across the Strait of Johor, lies the island country of Singapore. Peninsular Malaysia accounts for the majority (roughly 81.3%) of Malaysia's population and economy; as of 2017, its population was roughly 26 million (82% of the total population).

States and territories 

Peninsular Malaysia consists of 11 out of the 13 states, and two out of the three federal territories of Malaysia, which includes the national capital of Kuala Lumpur. The states are listed as the following:

Perlis
Kedah
Penang
Perak
Selangor
Negeri Sembilan
Malacca
Johor
Pahang
Terengganu
Kelantan

Two federal territories are embedded within Selangor, which are Putrajaya and Kuala Lumpur.

Etymology 
Originally comprising the states and territories of the Federation of Malaya, the then Federation merged with the self-governing State of Singapore and the British Colonies of North Borneo (now known as Sabah) and Sarawak under the Malaysia Agreement as the States of Malaya, the Borneo States of Sabah and Sarawak, and the State of Singapore of the new Federation called Malaysia. The merger was initially proposed in order to reunify Singapore with its hinterland in the Federation as they were originally associated under British Malaya but later separated with the formation of the Malayan Union. Even when the Malayan Union transformed into the Federation of Malaya, Singapore was still left out. Although politically distinct, Malaya was still seen geographically as comprising the States of the Federation of Malaya in the Peninsula and Singapore. In order to facilitate merger, the Borneo States (which initially included Brunei) were brought in as it was believed that with the inclusion of the various ethnic groups in Borneo, the racial arithmetic would be offset such that the influx of chinese from Singapore would not politically overwhelm Malaya. Ultimately, Singapore opted not to have complete merger with Malaya so as to gain autonomy in labour, education and health unlike the other states in the Federation of Malaya. In exchange, Singapore received underproportioned representation in the House of Representatives of Parliament. Singapore was seen as having a special status (similar to Northern Ireland in the scheme of the United Kingdom) and was thus not grouped with the other states in the Peninsula. Legally, Malaya geographically comprises of the States of Malaya and Singapore. Although Singapore left the Federation 2 years later in 1965, the Interpretation Act 1965 of the Parliament of Singapore still defines Malaya as comprising the States of Malaya and Singapore. Today, the States of Malaya are colloquially referred to as Peninsular Malaysia and West Malaysia.

Terminology 
States of Malaya/Peninsular Malaysia comprises the States of Johor, Kedah, Kelantan, Malacca, Negeri Sembilan, Pahang, Penang, Perak, Perlis, Selangor, and Terengganu, as well as the Federal Territories of Kuala Lumpur and Putrajaya.

Malaya comprises the States of Malaya and the Republic of Singapore. 

Malay Peninsula comprises the southern tip of Myanmar, southern Thailand, the States of Malaya and Singapore.

Demographics

The majority of people on Peninsular Malaysia are ethnic Malays, predominantly Muslim. Large Chinese and Indian populations exist. The Orang Asli are the indigenous people of Peninsular Malaysia; they number around 140,000 and mostly live in inland parts of the region.

Economy
As of 2012, Peninsular Malaysia oil production stood at 520,000 barrel of oil equivalent per day.

Other features

East Coast and West Coast 
The term East Coast (Jawi: ڤنتاي تيمور)  is particularly used in Malaysia to describe the following states in Peninsular Malaysia facing the South China Sea, a marginal sea of the Pacific Ocean:

Kelantan
Pahang
Terengganu

The term West Coast (Jawi: ڤنتاي بارت) refers informally to a collection of states in Peninsular Malaysia situated towards the western coast generally facing the Strait of Malacca which is a component of the Indian Ocean, as opposed to the East Coast. Unlike the East Coast, the West Coast is partitioned further into three regions (as seen in #States and territories), including:

 The Northern Region: Perlis, Kedah, Penang and Perak.
 The Central Region: Selangor and the federal territories of Kuala Lumpur and Putrajaya.
 The Southern Region: Negeri Sembilan, Melaka and Johor.

Even though Johor has a coastline facing the South China Sea on the Pacific Ocean, it is not generally regarded as an East Coast state, since the main coastline of the state is located on the Straits of Johor of the Indian Ocean.

West and East Malaysia 
The distinction between West and East Malaysia (Sabah and Sarawak) goes beyond the sphere of geography. Being separate regions administratively before the formation of the Malaysia, there exists more autonomy than the original States of Malaya, e.g. in having a different judicial court structure and separate immigration regulations. These rights were granted as part of Sarawak's 18-point agreement and Sabah's 20-point agreement with the Federation of Malaya during the formation of expanded federation.

See also 

 Malaya (disambiguation)
 Golden Chersonese
 Malayan dollar
 Geography of Malaysia

References

External links

 

 
 
 
Geography of Malaysia
Malaysia
Malaysia